USC&GS Taku was a United States Coast and Geodetic Survey survey ship in service from 1898 to 1917. She was the only Coast and Geodetic Survey ship to bear the name.

Taku was built by George Kneass at San Francisco, California, at a cost of $11,844.35 (USD) in 1898. The Coast and Geodetic Survey placed her in service that year. She spent her Survey career in the Pacific, primarily in the waters of the Territory of Alaska.

On July 15, 1898 Taku arrived "in disabled condition" at St. Michael, Alaska while the new steamer Yukon was being assembled. Urgent repairs to Taku slightly delayed assembly of Yukon. On July 30 she was seaworthy and Taku sailed at 2 p. m. on August 1, 1898 with a field party first to erect signals and do triangulation on St. Michael and Stuart Islands after which she departed for the mouth of the Kwiklok for regular survey work.

Tragedy struck Takus crew in 1910 when a member of her crew, Seaman H. Fitch, drowned when a small boat under sail was upset in Cordova Bay, Alaska.

Taku was retired from Coast and Geodetic Survey service in 1917.

Notes

References

NOAA History, A Science Odyssey: Tools of the Trade: Ships: Coast and Geodetic Survey Ships: Taku
NOAA History, A Science Odyssey: Hall of Honor: In the Line of Duty 1846-1936

Ships of the United States Coast and Geodetic Survey
Survey ships of the United States
Ships built in San Francisco
1898 ships
Alaska-related ships